Senthil (born 23 March 1951) is an Indian comedy actor who works in Tamil cinema. He is famous for his comedian roles along with fellow actor Goundamani. The pair dominated the Tamil industry as comedians in the 1980s and 90s.

Personal life 
Senthil was born on 23 March 1951 in a small village called Ilanjambore near Mudukulathur in Ramanathapuram District in Tamil Nadu.  He married Kalaiselvi on 14 May 1984. He has two sons, Dr Manikanda Prabhu and Hemachandra Prabhu. His two grand daughters were born in 2008 and 2014.

Career

As actor 
He ran away from his village at the age of 13 due to his father's scoldings. He first worked in an oil mart, then in a private wine shop as a waiter and then ended up in drama where he started developing his skills.

He made his debut with Oru Koyil Iru Dheepangal (1979) though officially his first film was Ithikkara Pakki which was released in 1980. He slowly entered the Tamil film industry in small characters and finally landed a good role in the film Malayoor Mambattiyan. He has acted in many popular films with several of the leading actors and comedians in the south Indian cine industry.  He usually appears in films with Goundamani in a slapstick double act. Together they have formed a comic pair in many Tamil films and were known as the Laurel and Hardy of Tamil Cinema.

In 2019, Senthil has started acting in Tamil tele-serials making his debut with Sun TV's Rasathi.

Politics 
Initially campaigning for AIADMK, Senthil is currently campaigning for AMMK party. Former minister Gokula Indira was replaced in the post of organising secretary by Senthil, appointed by T. T. V. Dhinakaran in AIADMK in 2017. Later, he joined TTV Dinakaran's Amma Makkal Munnetra Kazhagam political party. In September 2019, Senthil, Kathirkamu, Raja Manickam, Devadas and Henry Thomas were announced as the five organisation secretaries of AMMK party. He joined Bharatiya Janata Party, just before the 2021 Tamil Nadu Assembly elections.

Partial filmography

1970s

1980s

1990s

2000s

2010s

2020s

Television

References

External links 
 

Indian male film actors
Male actors from Tamil Nadu
Tamil comedians
Living people
1951 births
Tamil male actors
Indian male comedians
Indian Tamil people
Male actors in Tamil cinema